= Tibba Meharban Shah Halt railway station =

Railway station in Tibba Mehrban Shah, Pakistan

General information
- Owner: Ministry of Railways

Other information
- Station code: TIB

History
- Former names: Great Indian Peninsula Railway

Tibba Meharban Shah Halt railway station (Urdu: ٹبہ مہربان شاہ ہالٹ ریلوے اسٹیشن) is located in Pakistan.

== See also ==
- List of railway stations in Pakistan
- Pakistan Railways
